Who's Got the Action? is a 1962 American comedy film directed by Daniel Mann from a screenplay by Jack Rose, based on the novel Four Horse Players Are Missing by Alexander Rose. It stars Dean Martin and Lana Turner, with Eddie Albert, Walter Matthau, Paul Ford, and Nita Talbot. The film concerns a man suffering from an addiction to gambling.

Plot
The gambling habit of lawyer Steve Flood is beginning to get on the nerves of his wife Melanie, who initially suspects him of marital infidelity. When she learns about the gambling, Melanie talks Steve's law partner Clint Morgan, an old flame, into helping her act as a fictitious horse race bookie offering unusually attractive terms to clients.

The plan is for Steve to lose enough money to permanently rid him of the betting habit, but it goes awry when he suddenly begins winning bets on a number of long-shot horses. Flood's winning streak attracts the attention of two horse-playing judges, Boatwright and Fogel, who persuade Flood to place bets for them with his mysterious “bookie.” Melanie and Morgan are astounded when the judges begin winning large wagers as well.

The make-believe bookmaking activity arouses the ire of syndicate mobster Tony Gagouts, who is furious to know who is "getting the action". Gagouts's mistress, a nightclub singer named Saturday Knight, happens to be the Floods' next-door neighbor, and assists Melanie in raising cash for the gambling payoffs by purchasing various furnishings from the Floods' apartment (using Gagouts' ill-gotten money).

The source of the mysterious “bookmaking” is traced to the Floods' apartment by Gagouts through an illegal telephone wiretap. He and a team of thugs descend upon the apartment, where they are surprised to find all the defecting gamblers assembled. They are thunderstruck when a coercive interrogation reveals that Melanie Flood is the “bookie” they have been seeking.

Steve Flood ultimately convinces Gagouts to forgive all of their gambling debts by arguing that only by marrying his mistress Saturday can he avoid the risk of incriminating testimony. In one stroke this fulfills Saturday's long-sought goal, saves the Floods' marriage, insulates Gagouts from future prosecution and clears Melanie's $18,000 gambling payoff burden.

Cast
Dean Martin as Steve Flood
Lana Turner as Melanie Flood
Eddie Albert as Clint Morgan
Walter Matthau as Tony Gagouts
Paul Ford as Judge Boatwright
Nita Talbot as Saturday Knight
John McGiver as Judge Fogel
Jack Albertson as Hodges

Production notes

The storyline is based on the novel Four Horse Players Are Missing (1960) by Alexander Rose, who also plays a minor role in the film (as Mr. Goody). This novel, in turn, was closely related to Damon Runyon's short story "Little Miss Marker".

Many of the scenes were filmed on location in Flood's/Knight's luxurious penthouse apartments in the historic Talmadge building on Los Angeles' Wilshire Boulevard; much of the automobile driving shown runs up and down Wilshire Boulevard.

References

External links
 
 
 
 
 

1962 films
1962 comedy films
1960s American films
1960s English-language films
American comedy films
Films directed by Daniel Mann
Films scored by George Duning
Films about gambling
Paramount Pictures films